The Other Side of the Door is a 1916 American silent romantic drama film directed by Tom Ricketts. Based on the novel of the same name by Lucia Chamberlain, it stars Harold Lockwood and May Allison.

Plot
Sets in the 19th century, the plot centered on a man (Harold Lockwood) who is falsely accused of murder. The Other Side of the Door was shot in Monterrey, Mexico.

Cast
 Harold Lockwood as Johnny Montgomery
 May Allison
 Josephine Humphreys as Carlotta Valencia
 William Stowell
 Harry von Meter
 Dick La Reno
 Roy Stewart
 Walter Spencer

References

External links

1916 films
1916 romantic drama films
American romantic drama films
American silent feature films
American black-and-white films
Films based on American novels
Films set in the 19th century
Films shot in Mexico
Films directed by Tom Ricketts
1910s American films
Silent romantic drama films
Silent American drama films